Saint-Lary, known as Saint-Lary-du-Gers for disambiguation, is a commune in the Gers department, and the region of Occitania, southwestern France.

The inhabitants of the commune are known as Saint-Lariens (masculine plural) and Saint-Lariennes (feminine plural).

Geography

Population

See also
Communes of Gers

References

Communes of Gers